Mandibuloacral dysplasia (MAD) is a rare autosomal recessive syndrome characterized by mandibular hypoplasia, delayed cranial suture closure, dysplastic clavicles, abbreviated and club-shaped terminal phalanges, acroosteolysis, atrophy of the skin of the hands and feet, and typical facial changes.

Types

See also 
 Hereditary sclerosing poikiloderma
 Skin lesion

References

External links 

Genodermatoses